An affected community indicates a community affected by a disease. This may refer to:
 HIV-affected community
 Leper colony
 A community affected in an epidemic or pandemic